The 1999 DFB-Pokal Final decided the winner of the 1998–99 DFB-Pokal, the 56th season of Germany's premier knockout football cup competition. It was played on 12 June 1999 at the Olympiastadion in Berlin. Werder Bremen won the match 5–4 on penalties against Bayern Munich, following a 1–1 draw after extra time, to claim their 4th cup title.

Route to the final
The DFB-Pokal began with 64 teams in a single-elimination knockout cup competition. There were a total of five rounds leading up to the final. Teams were drawn against each other, and the winner after 90 minutes would advance. If still tied, 30 minutes of extra time was played. If the score was still level, a penalty shoot-out was used to determine the winner.

Note: In all results below, the score of the finalist is given first (H: home; A: away).

Match

Details

References

External links
 Match report at kicker.de 
 Match report at WorldFootball.net
 Match report at Fussballdaten.de 

FC Bayern Munich matches
SV Werder Bremen matches
1998–99 in German football cups
1999
June 1999 sports events in Europe
1999 in Berlin
Football competitions in Berlin
Association football penalty shoot-outs